The 1973 Australian Sports Car Championship was a CAMS sanctioned motor racing title open to Group A Sports Cars and Group D Production Sports Cars.  It was the fifth Australian Sports Car Championship. The title was won by South Australian Phil Moore, driving a 2.5 litre Repco V8 - engined Elfin 360.

Calendar

The championship was contested over a six round series with one race per round.

Classes and points system
Car competed in two engine displacement classes:
 Up to and including 2500cc
 Over 2500cc

Championship points were allocated on a 9-6-4-3-2-1 basis to the first six place-getters in each class  at each round. Additional points were awarded on a 4-3-2-1 basis to the first four outright place-getters, regardless of class, at each round.

Results

Only the top ten championship positions are shown in the above table.

References

External links
 1973 Australian Sports Car racing images at www.autopics.com.au
 1973 Western Australian Race Results at www.terrywalkersplace.com 

1973
 Sports Car Championship